Bang Rakam may refer to:
 Bang Rakam District
 Bang Rakam Subdistrict